The BET Award for Best New Artist is given to an artist who made their debut the previous or same year of the awards ceremony. A former group member can be nominated for the award if they have made their solo debut. Controversy arose when  Jennifer Hudson won the award in 2007 even though her only solo release at the time was a single of "And I Am Telling You I'm Not Going"; her first album was scheduled for release in October 2007. Sam Smith is so far the only Caucasian artist to have won the award, winning it in 2015.

Winners and nominees
Winners are listed first and highlighted in bold.

 Grammy Award for Best New Artist winning artist – †
 Grammy Award for Best New Artist nominated artist – ‡

2000s

2010s

2020s

References

BET Awards
Music awards for breakthrough artist